Micheline Luccioni (1930–1992) was a French stage, film and television actress. Her son, José Luccioni, is also an actor.

Partial filmography

 Gervaise (1956) - Clémence - une blanchisseuse, ouvrière chez Gervaise
 Baratin (1956) - Brigitte
 Lovers of Paris (1957) - Valérie Vabre
 Back to the Wall (1958) - La postière
 Maxime (1958) - Liliane d'Aix
 Guinguette (1959) - Une amie de Guinguette
 Un témoin dans la ville (1959) - Germaine - une radio taxi
 Croquemitoufle (1959) - Nénette
 Maigret et l'Affaire Saint-Fiacre (1959) - Arlette - une prostituée
 Way of Youth (1959) - Solange, la secrétaire de Charles Michaud
 Tête folle (1960) - Suzanne
 La brune que voilà (1960) - Paulette - la secrétaire
 It Happened All Night (1960) - La fille du bois de Boulogne
 Les livreurs (1961) - Madame Bellanger
 Le puits aux trois vérités (1961) - La radio-reporter
 Le Tracassin (1961) - Jeannette - la serveuse du restaurant
 Le Majordome (1965) - Arlette
 Les Bons Vivants (1965) - Carmen, une pensionnaire (segment "Fermeture, La") (uncredited)
 La sentinelle endormie (1966) - Clémence
 An Idiot in Paris (1967) - Lucienne - une prostituée
 Fleur d'oseille (1967) - Une salope
 A Little Virtuous (1968) - Doris
 Le tatoué (1968) - L'aubergiste
 Elle boit pas, elle fume pas, elle drague pas, mais... elle cause ! (1970) - Lucette
 Children of Mata Hari (1970) - L'employée des postes
 L'homme orchestre (1970) - La femme ivre sur le yacht (uncredited)
 Le Distrait (1970) - Madame Gastier
 Jo (1971) - Françoise
 Le drapeau noir flotte sur la marmite (1971) - Paulette Simonet
 Églantine (1972) - Yolande - une fille d'Eglantine
 Les grands sentiments font les bons gueuletons (1973) - Christiane Armand
 Vogue la galère (1973, TV Movie) - Marion
 On n'est pas sérieux quand on a 17 ans (1974) - La mère de Bess
 Vous ne l'emporterez pas au paradis (1975) - Gina
 Dis bonjour à la dame!.. (1977) - Madame Ferry
 Je vous ferai aimer la vie (1979) - Madame Kolb
 Cherchez l'erreur (1980) - Solange
 Prends ta rolls et va pointer (1981) - Germaine Vignault
 Vive la sociale! (1983) - Madame Armand

References

Bibliography 
 Peter Cowie & Derek Elley. World Filmography: 1967. Fairleigh Dickinson University Press, 1977.

External links 
 

1930 births
1992 deaths
French film actresses
French stage actresses
French television actresses
People from Palaiseau
20th-century French women